Kaissar Broadcasting Network, Inc. is a Philippine radio network. Its corporate office is located at 926-B, San Jose St., Brgy. Mauway, Mandaluyong. KBNI operates a number of stations across regional places in the Philippines.

KBNI stations

AM Stations

FM Stations

Television

References

Radio stations in the Philippines
Philippine radio networks